Giulia della Rovere (1531, Casteldurante – 4 April 1563, Ferrara) was an Italian noblewoman. A portrait of her by Titian survives in the Palazzo Pitti in Florence.

Life
She was the daughter of Francesco Maria I della Rovere, Duke of Urbino and Eleonora Gonzaga. On 3 January 1549 she married Alfonso d'Este, an illegitimate son of Alfonso I d'Este, Duke of Ferrara, and of Laura Dianti. They had three children:
Cesare (8 October 1552 – 11 December 1628); married Virginia de' Medici;
Alfonsino (14 November 1560 – 4 September 1578), married his cousin Marfisa d'Este;
Eleonora (Ferrara, 1561–Naples, 1637); married the composer Carlo Gesualdo.

References

1531 births
1563 deaths
Giulia
House of Gonzaga
House of Este
16th-century Italian women